Jeffrey Lewis (born 1975) is an American singer-songwriter.

Jeffrey or Jeff Lewis may also refer to:

Jeffrey Lewis (composer) (born 1942), Welsh composer
Jeff Lewis (real estate speculator) (born 1970), American real estate speculator and star of reality television series Flipping Out
Jeff Lewis (American football) (1973–2013), American football player
Jeff Lewis (writer), American screenwriter associated with Hill Street Blues
Jeff Lewis, Republican member of the U.S. state Georgia House of Representatives since 1993
Jeffrey Lewis (academic), American nuclear proliferation academic and researcher
Jeff Lewis (professor), Australian professor at Royal Melbourne Institute of Technology

See also
Geoffrey Lewis (disambiguation)
Jeffreys Lewis (ca. 1852–1926), British-born American actress
Jeff Louis (born 1992), Haitian international footballer